Mohsen Qara'ati is an Iranian Shia cleric who was born in 1945 in the city of Kashan, and his father was Ali Naqi (Qara'ati). Mohsen Qara'ati who is commonly known as "Ayatollah Qara'ati" or "Hujjat al-islam Qara'ati," was appointed as the representative of Sayyid Ruhollah Khomeini (the founder and previous leader of Islamic Republic of Iran) at the "literacy movement organization" in Iran in 1981.

Mohsen Qara'ati who is also known as "Haj Aqa Qara'ati", has been appointed as the chief of "Setade Eqame Namaz" (the headquarters of prayer presenting)". Among the most famous characteristics of this Shi'a clergy is that he tries to follow timely jokes in his lectures, which makes his speeches more interesting from the view of the listeners. He has also suggested making a "Halal laughing site" (to pass free times by Halal [permissible] laughing).

He has stated in his sermons that anyone that declares themselves to be a Baha'i must be killed.

Books
 Familiarity with prayer
 114 points about prayer
 Interpretation of prayer
 Principles of Islamic beliefs
 Oneness
 Justice
 Prophecy
 Imamate
 Resurrection
 Gnahshnasy
 Hajj
 The human and world in the Quran
 Enjoining good and forbidding wrong
 Minutes with the Quran (taken from the interpretation of light)
 Quranic questions and answers
 Important questions, short answers using examples
 Tafsir Noor (10 full volume commentary of the Quran)

References

Iranian ayatollahs
Kashan
Kashan County
1945 births
Living people
Iran's Book of the Year Awards recipients